The following list includes settlements, geographic features, and political subdivisions of Maine whose names are derived from Native American languages.

Listings

Counties

 Androscoggin County: (Abnaki) "place where fish are dried/cured"
 Androscoggin River
 Little Androscoggin River
 Androscoggin Lake
 Aroostook County
 Aroostook River: (Mi'kmaq) "beautiful river"
 Kennebec County
 Kennebec River: (Abnaki) "long quiet water"
 Little Kennebec Bay
 Penobscot County: (Abnaki?) tribal name; "place of descending rocks/ledges"
 Town of Penobscot
 Penobscot River
 North Branch Penobscot River
 West Branch Penobscot River
 East Branch Penobscot River
 South Branch Penobscot River
 Penobscot Bay
 Penobscot Pond
 Penobscot Island
 Little Penobscot Island
 Piscataquis County: (Abnaki) "at the river branch"
 Piscataquis River
 West Branch Piscataquis River
 East Branch Piscataquis River
 Sagadahoc County
 Sagadahoc Bay

Settlements

 Allagash River (and town): (Abnaki) "bark shelter"
 Allagash Lake
 Allagash Pond
 Arrowsic
 Arrowsic Island
 Caribou: (Abnaki) kalibu "shoveler" (gets food by pawing or shoveling)
 Caribou Mountain
 Carrabassett Valley
 Carrabassett River
 Casco: (Mi'kmaq) muddy
 Casco Bay
 Damariscotta: (Abnaki) "many alewives"
 Damariscotta Lake
 Damariscotta River
 Kenduskeag
 Kenduskeag Stream
 Kennebunk: (Abnaki) "long sand bar"
 Kennebunk River
 Kennebunkport
 Kennebunk Dam
 Machias
 Town of Machiasport
 Macwahoc
 Madawaska
 Magalloway: likely of Abnaki origin, meaning "large tail".
 Magalloway River
 Little Magalloway River
 West Branch Little Magalloway River
 Middle Branch Little Magalloway River
 West Branch Magalloway River
 First East Branch Magalloway River
 Second East Branch Magalloway River
 Third East Branch Magalloway River
 Mattawamkeag: (Abnaki) "fishing beyond gravel bar" or (Mi'kmaq) "on a sand bar"
 Mattawamkeag Lake
 Mattawamkeag River
 West Branch Mattawamkeag River
 East Branch Mattawamkeag River
 Mexico
 Millinocket: (Abnaki) "this place is admirable"
 Town of East Millinocket
 Millinocket Lake
 Millinocket Disposal Pond
 Monhegan: (Mi'kmaq or Maliseet) "out-to-sea island"
 New Canada
 Nollesemic: (Abnaki) "resting place at the falls"
 Nollesemic Lake
 Ogunquit: (Mi'kmaq) "lagoons within dunes"
 Ogunquit River
 Orono: (Abnaki) purportedly from a Chief Joseph Orono, no translation
 Oquossoc: (Abnaki) "place of trout" (a certain trout-type)
 Passadumkeag: (Abnaki) "rapids over gravel beds"
 Passadumkeag River
 Sabattus
 Sabattus River
 Sabbatus Pond
 Little Sabattus Pond
 Saco: (Abnaki) "flowing out" or "outlet"
 Saco River
 Old Course Saco River
 Little Saco River
 Sebago: (Abnaki) "big lake"
 Sebago Lake
 Sebec
 Sebec River
 Sebec Lake
 Seboeis
 Seboeis River
 Little Seboeis River
 West Seboeis Stream
 Seboeis Lake
 Grand Lake Seboeis
 Seboeis Deadwater
 Village of Seboomook Lake: (Abnaki) "at the large stream"
 Seboomook Lake
 Skowhegan (town): (Abnaki) "watching place [for fish]"
 Scopan Lake (and town): (Abnaki) "bear's den"
 Willimantic
 Wiscasset

Bodies of Water

 Abagadasset River
 Alamoosook Lake
 Annabessacook Lake
 Aziscohos Lake: (Abnaki) "small pine trees"
 Aziscohos Pond
 Bagaduce River
 Baskahegan Lake
 Big Machia Lake and Little Machia Lake
 Big Madagascal Pond and Little Madagascal Pond
 Bunganock Pond
 Cambolasse Pond
 Cape Neddick River
 Caribou Lake (Island Falls)
 Caribou Lake	(Washburn)
 Caribou Egg Pond
 Caucomgomoc Lake
 Caucogomoc Stream
 Chemquasabamticook Lake: (Abnaki) "where there is a large lake and rocks"
 Chesuncook Lake: (Abnaki) "at the principal outlet"
 Chesuncook Pond
 Chickawaukie Pond
 Chimenticook River
 Chiputneticook Lakes: (Abnaki) "at the place of the big hill stream"
 Cobscook Bay: (Maliseet) "rocks under water"
 Cobbosseecontee Lake: (Abnaki) "many sturgeon"
 Little Cobbosseecontee Lake
 Cochnewagon Pond
 Cupsuptic River
 East Branch Cupsuptic River
 Little East Branch Cupsuptic River
 Cuxabexis Lake
 Daaquam River
 Debsconeag Lakes
 Debsconeag Deadwater
 Eggemoggin Reach
 Gammon Pond
 Harraseeket River
 Hockomock Bay
 Katahdin Lake
 Kamankeag Pond
 Keewaydin Lake
 Kennebago Lake: (Abnaki) "long/large pond/lake"
 Little Kennebago Lake
 Kennebago River
 West Kennebago Mountain
 East Kennebago Mountain
 Kennebago Divide
 Keoka Lake
 Lake Anasagunticook
 Lake Kashwakamak
 Lake Onawa
 Lake Wassookeag
 La Pomkeag Lake
 Lower La Pomkeag Lake
 Little Pushaw Pond
 Lunksoos Lake
 Upper Macwahoc Lake and Lower Macwahoc Lake	
 Madawaska River: (Mi'kmaq) "where one river joins another"
 Little Madawaska River
 Madawaska Lake
 Manhancock Pond
 Maquoit Bay
 Maranacook Lake
 Massachusetts Bog
 Matagamon Lake: (Abnaki) "far on the other side"
 Mattamiscontis Lake: (Abnaki) "many ale-wives"
 Little Mattamiscontis Lake
 Mattanawcook Pond
 Mattaseunk Lake
 Medomak River
 Medomak Pond
 Little Medomak Pond
 Meduncook River
 Medunkenuk Lake
 Meduxnekeag River
 North Branch Meduxnekeag River
 South Branch Meduxnekeag River
 Meduxnekeag Lake
 Megunticook Lake
 Megunticook River
 Messalonskee Lake
 Metallak Pond	
 Millimagassett Lake
 Minnehonk Lake
 Moccasin Pond	
 Mollidgewock Pond
 Molunkus Pond: (Abnaki) "ravine"
 Molunkus Stream
 Molunkus Lake
 Mooseleuk Lake
 Mooselookmeguntic Lake: (Abnaki) "moose feeding place" (portage to or big trees at)
 Mousam River
 Middle Branch Mousam River
 Mousam Lake
 Munsungan Lake
 Muscongus Bay: (Abnaki) "many/large rock ledges"
 Musquash Lake: (Abnaki) "muskrat"
 Musquash Pond
 Musquacook Stream: (Abnaki) "muskrat place"
 Musquacook Lakes
 Nahmakanta Lake: (Abnaki) "many fish"
 Narraguagus Bay
 Narraguagus River
 Little Narraguagus River
 West Branch Narraguagus River (Hancock County)
 West Branch Narraguagus River (Cherryfield)
 Narraguagus Lake
 Narramissic River
 Nehumkeag Pond
 Neoutaquet River
 Nequassett Lake
 Nesowadnehunk Lake
 Little Nesowadnehunk Lake
 Nezinscot River
 West Branch Nezinscot River
 East Branch Nezinscot River
 Nicatous Lake
 Nokomis Pond
 Nollesemic Lake
 Ossipee River: (Abnaki) "beyond the water"
 Little Ossipee River
 Ossipee Lake
 Papoose Pond
 Little Papoose Pond
 Parmachenee Lake
 Passamagamet Lake
 Passagassawakeag River
 Lake Passagassawakeag
 Passamaquoddy Bay: tribal name; "place of abundance of pollack"
 Pattee Pond
 Pemadumcook Chain of Lakes: (Maliseet) "extended sand bar place"
 Ambajejus
 Pemadumcook Lake
 Pemaquid River
 Pemaquid Pond
 Pennamaquan River
 Pennesseewassee Lake
 Little Pennesseewassee Lake
 Pequawket Lake
 Piscataqua River
 Piscataqua River (tributary)
 East Branch Piscataqua River
 Pocasset Lake
 Pocwock River
 Pockwockamus Deadwater
 Podunk Pond
 Presumpscot River
 Pushaw Lake
 Quahog Bay
 Quantabacook Lake
 Rockabema Lake
 Saponac Pond
 Sasanoa River
 Scammon Pond
 Schoodic Lake
 Schoodic Bog
 Sebago Lake
 Little Sebago Lake
 Sebasticook River: (Penobscot-Abnaki) "almost-through place"
 East Branch Sebasticook River
 Sebasticook Lake
 Sennebec Pond
 Shillalah Pond
 Skitacook Lake
 Songo River
 Spednic Lake
 Sysladobsis Lake
 Upper Sysladobsis Lake
 Tacoma Lakes
 Umbagog Lake
 Umbazooksus Lake
 Umcolcus Lake: (Abnaki) "whistling duck"
 Umsaskis Lake
 Usuntabunt Lake: (Abnaki) "wet head" or possibly "three heads" 
 Wassutaquook River
 Watchic Pond
 Little Watchic Pond
 Webhannet River: (Abnaki) "at the clear stream"
 Weskeag River
 Wesserunsett Lake	
 Wheelock Lake
 Wohoa Bay
 Wytopitlock Lake
 Piscataqua River (New Hampshire border): (Pennacook) "the place where the river divides"

Islands

 Bunganuc Island
 Chebeague Island: (Abnaki) "separated place"
 Malaga Island
 Manana Island
 Matinicus Island: (Abnaki) "far-out island"
 Matinicus Rock
 Menigawum Island
 Metinic Island: (Abnaki) "far-out island"
 Mingo Island
 Mosquick Island
 Nahamkeag Island
 Opechee Island
 Sampsong Point
 Schoodic Island
 Schoppee Island
 Sebascodegan Island
 Squantum Point

Other

 Bauneg Beg Mountain
 Mount Agamenticus
 Mount Katahdin: (Abnaki) "the principal mountain"
 Mount Kineo
 Mount Pisgah
 Mount Tire'm
 Pemaquid Point: (Mi'kmaq) "extended land" (peninsula)
 Quoddy Head: (Passamaquoddy) abbreviation to "pollack"
 Shawnee Peak

See also
List of place names in the United States of Native American origin

References

Citations

Sources

 Bright, William (2004). Native American Placenames of the United States. Norman: University of Oklahoma Press. .

 
History of Maine
Place names
Native American history of Maine